Lancaster Crematorium is a historic crematorium located at Greenwood Cemetery in Lancaster, Lancaster County, Pennsylvania.  It was built in 1884, and is a one-story, brick building in the Late Gothic Revival style. It measures 48 feet by 32 feet and has a moderately pitched gable roof.

It was added to the National Register of Historic Places in 1983.

References

Buildings and structures on the National Register of Historic Places in Pennsylvania
Gothic Revival architecture in Pennsylvania
Commercial buildings completed in 1884
Buildings and structures in Lancaster, Pennsylvania
National Register of Historic Places in Lancaster, Pennsylvania
Crematoria in the United States